Matilda Elizabeth Ramsay (born 8 November 2001) is an English television presenter, chef and social media influencer best known for presenting the BBC cooking show Matilda and the Ramsay Bunch on CBBC alongside her family. Ramsay has made numerous television appearances including This Morning, Gordon Ramsay's Home Cooking, Blue Peter, MasterChef Junior, Friday Night Jazz, and The Late Late Show with James Corden. Her parents are Tana Ramsay, a cook book author, and Gordon Ramsay, a celebrity chef. She resides in both the United Kingdom and the United States with her family and was a contestant on the nineteenth series of Strictly Come Dancing. Ramsay was also a contestant on Celebrity MasterChef Australia where she reached the final.

Early life and career

2010–present
Before Ramsay started presenting Matilda and the Ramsay Bunch on CBBC, she made several appearances on her father's TV shows MasterChef Junior and Hell's Kitchen from 2010 to 2015.

In 2013, she appeared alongside her dad on Gordon Ramsay's Home Cooking to teach home cooking. Her mom also would appear on occasion.

In 2015, it was announced that Ramsay would host her own cooking and entertainment show on CBBC. Matilda and the Ramsay Bunch, which is aimed at the younger audience, stars all the members of the Ramsay family as they go on their summer holidays. The first series was aired on 14 April 2015, with the second series airing 6 May 2016 and the third series airing on 5 May 2017. Each series is made up of 15 episodes.

Ramsay grew up in London, but divides her time between South West London and Los Angeles for her father's television career. She has been a keen cook from a young age.

Her sister, Megan Ramsay, ran the London Marathon in 2017 in memory of her baby brother Rocky, after her mother suffered a miscarriage five months into her pregnancy in June 2016.

It was announced in June 2017 that Ramsay's CBBC show Matilda and the Ramsay Bunch had been renewed for a fourth series to air in 2018. The fourth series began on 24 April 2018.

From September 2018, Ramsay, alongside her father, appears on the ITV show This Morning in a regular cooking segment titled "Big Chef Little Chef" which will see the Ramsays cook foods and try and help children get into cooking.

Ramsay made an appearance on Season 18 of Hell's Kitchen as a special guest in the eighth episode, where the dinner service was centred around her Sweet 16 birthday party.

Ramsay lends her voice to the All3Media-owned company One Potato Two Potato, originally a joint venture between Optomen and her father, where she says the company name in a singalong style.

In 2021, Ramsay competed in the nineteenth series of Strictly Come Dancing and was partnered with professional dancer Nikita Kuzmin. On 28 November 2021, she became the ninth celebrity to be eliminated from the competition.

Filmography

Awards and nominations

Bibliography
In March 2015, Ramsay announced that she had written her first cookery book based on the CBBC show of the same name. The book was released on 4 May 2017.
 Matilda & The Ramsay Bunch: Tilly's Kitchen Takeover (2017)

References

External links
 

2001 births
Living people
English television presenters
English television actresses
English child actresses
21st-century English actresses
English people of Irish descent
English people of Scottish descent
Actresses from London